The Ivan Racheff House is a historic house with gardens at 1943 Tennessee Avenue in Knoxville, Tennessee, United States.  The house was originally built in 1902, but was later modified by Knoxville Iron Works president Ivan Racheff for use as an office and apartment. Racheff Gardens was established by Racheff in 1947.  The house is now used by the Tennessee Federation of Garden Clubs, who maintain the gardens.  The property is listed on the National Register of Historic Places.

References
 The Future of Knoxville's Past: Historic and Architectural Resources in Knoxville, Tennessee.  (Knoxville Historic Zoning Commission, October, 2006), page 25.

External links
 National Register of Historic Places
 https://web.archive.org/web/20070712083132/http://www.knoxmpc.org/historic/areas/citylist.htm

Houses in Knoxville, Tennessee
Houses on the National Register of Historic Places in Tennessee
National Register of Historic Places in Knoxville, Tennessee